The 2001–02 Iowa Hawkeyes men's basketball team represented the University of Iowa as members of the Big Ten Conference during the 2001–02 NCAA Division I men's basketball season. The team was led by third-year head coach Steve Alford and played their home games at Carver–Hawkeye Arena. After starting the season ranked in the AP Top 10, they finished 19-16 overall and 5–11 in Big Ten play.

Roster

Schedule/Results

|-
!colspan=8| Non-Conference Regular Season
|-

|-
!colspan=8| Big Ten Regular Season
|-

|-
!colspan=8| Big Ten tournament

|-
!colspan=8| National Invitation Tournament

Rankings

References

Iowa Hawkeyes men's basketball seasons
Iowa
Iowa
2001 in sports in Iowa
2002 in sports in Iowa